Not a Pretty Girl is the sixth studio album released by singer-songwriter Ani DiFranco on her own record label, Righteous Babe Records. It was released July 18, 1995. The album extended the folk singer's early formula of acoustic guitar and drums. On subsequent records, DiFranco would add electric guitar, horns, band members and guest musicians, but on Not a Pretty Girl she was accompanied by Andy Stochansky's percussion alone.

According to Allmusic, "Light of Some Kind" is a "deeply felt portrait...in which the singer seems to be confessing to a man that she has been unfaithful to him with a woman" Released on Living in Clip, the track "Shy" earned DiFranco a 1997 Grammy Award nomination for Best Female Rock Vocal Performance.

"Shy" off the album is notable for being quoted by Matt Skiba of Alkaline Trio during live performances of the song "Ninety-Seven"

Artwork 

The CD case of Not a Pretty Girl is designed to be looked at "the wrong way 'round", with the spine on the right hand side rather than the left.

Track listing

Personnel 
 Ani DiFranco – guitar, bass, vocals
 Andy Stochansky – drums, percussion instrument/percussion

Production
 Ani DiFranco – record producer
 Ed Stone – engineer

References

Ani DiFranco albums
1995 albums
Righteous Babe Records albums